Mylothris chloris, the western dotted border or common dotted border, is a butterfly in the family Pieridae. It is found in Senegal, the Gambia, Mali, Guinea-Bissau, Guinea, Sierra Leone, Liberia, Ivory Coast, Burkina Faso, Ghana, Togo, Benin, Nigeria, Cameroon, Equatorial Guinea, Gabon, the Republic of the Congo, the Central African Republic, the Democratic Republic of the Congo, Sudan, Uganda, Kenya and Tanzania. The habitat consists of open woodland and dense savanna, but may also be found in disturbed rainforest areas and suburban gardens.

The larvae feed on Osyris abyssinicus, Englerina gabonensis, Phragmanthera capitata, Loranthus and Viscum species.

Subspecies
Mylothris chloris chloris (Senegal, the Gambia, Mali, Guinea-Bissau, Guinea, Sierra Leone, Liberia, Ivory Coast, Burkina Faso, Ghana, Togo, Benin, Nigeria, Cameroon, Equatorial Guinea, Gabon, Republic of the Congo, Central African Republic, Democratic Republic of the Congo, southern Sudan, north-western Tanzania)
Mylothris chloris clarissa Butler, 1888 (eastern Uganda, western Kenya)

References

External links
Seitz, A. Die Gross-Schmetterlinge der Erde 13: Die Afrikanischen Tagfalter. Plate XIII 10

Butterflies described in 1775
Pierini
Taxa named by Johan Christian Fabricius